Greek East and Latin West are terms used to distinguish between the two parts of the Greco-Roman world and of Medieval Christendom, specifically the eastern regions where Greek was the lingua franca (Greece, Anatolia, the southern Balkans, the Levant, and Egypt) and the western parts where Latin filled this role (Italy, Gaul, Hispania, the Maghreb, northern Balkans, territories in Central Europe, and the British Isles). Greek was spread in the context of Hellenization, whereas Latin was the official administrative language of Roman Empire. In the east, where both languages co-existed within the Roman administration for several centuries, the use of Latin ultimately declined as the role of Greek was further encouraged by administrative changes in the empire's structure between the 3rd and 5th centuries, which led to the split between the Eastern Roman Empire and the Western Roman Empire. This Greek–Latin divide continued with the East–West Schism of the Christian world during the Early Middle Ages.

Origins 

After the fall of the Western Part, pars occidentalis, of the Empire, the terms "Greek East" and "Latin West" are applied to areas that were formerly part of the Eastern or Western Parts of the Empire, and also to areas that fell under the Greek or Latin cultural sphere but that had never been part of the Roman Empire. This has given rise to two modern dichotomies. The first is the split of Chalcedonian Christianity that developed in Europe between Western Christianity (the forerunner of Catholicism, from which Protestantism split in 1517) and Eastern Orthodoxy. Second, Europeans have traditionally viewed the Greco-Roman Mediterranean (extending from Spain to Syria) as having an East/West cultural split. Cultures associated with the historical Romance, Germanic, Scandinavian, Hungarians, Finns, Balts, Celts, Catholic Slavs, and the historical Western Churches (Central and Western Europe) have traditionally been considered Western; these cultures adopted Latin as their lingua franca in the Middle Ages. Cultures associated with the Eastern Roman Empire and Russian Empire (Greeks, Orthodox Slavs, Romanians, Georgians, and to a lesser extent Thracian and Anatolian Turks, Albanians, and Bosniaks) have traditionally been considered Eastern; these cultures all used Greek or Old Church Slavonic as a lingua franca during the early Middle Ages.

Use with regard to the Roman Empire 

In the classical context, "Greek East" refers to the provinces and client states of the Roman Empire in which the lingua franca was primarily Greek.

This region included the whole Greek peninsula with some other northern parts in the Balkans, the provinces around the Black Sea, those of the Bosphorus, all of Asia Minor (in the loosest possible sense, to include Cappadocia and extending to Armenia Minor), Magna Graecia (southern part of the Italian peninsula and Sicily), and the other provinces along the eastern rim of the Mediterranean Sea (Judea, Syria, Cyrenaica and Egypt). These Roman provinces had been Greek colonies or Greek-ruled states during the Hellenistic period, i.e. until the Roman conquests.

At the start of late antiquity, beginning with the reorganization of the empire's provincial divisions during the reign of Diocletian (ruled 284–305), the concept of the Greek East developed to stand in contradistinction to the Latin West. Thereafter, Greek East refers to the Greek-speaking provinces mentioned above (after 395 mostly in the Greek-speaking Eastern Roman Empire) in contradistinction to the provinces in Western Europe, Italia (excluding the Catepanate of Italy, where they still spoke Greek) and Northwest Africa (after 395 in the Latin-speaking Western Roman Empire).

Use with regard to Christianity 

"Greek East" and "Latin West" are terms used also to divide Chalcedonian Christianity into the Greek-speaking, Eastern Orthodox peoples of the Eastern Mediterranean Basin, centered on the Byzantine Empire, and the Latin-speaking Catholic peoples of Western Europe. Here, Latin West applies to regions that were formerly part of the Western Roman Empire, specifically Italia, Gallia (Gaul), Hispania, Northwest Africa, and Britannia, but also to areas that had never been part of the Empire but which later came under the culture sphere of the Latin West, such as Magna Germania, Hibernia (Ireland), Caledonia (Scotland). In this sense, the term "Latin" came to refer to the liturgical and scholarly language of Western Europe, since many of these countries did not actually speak Latin. 

Modern scholars agree that by the 12th century, theological debate (or disputatio) between Christians of the Greek East and Latin West was focused on three Christian doctrines: 'the so-called filioque controversy regarding the procession of the Holy Spirit, leavened or unleavened bread in the Eucharist, and the primacy of the pope.' However, it is not known when or how this began.

British philosopher Philip Sherrard (1959) claimed that the cause of Christendom's split into a Greek East and a Latin West was differing conceptions of sacerdotium and regnum, leading the Orthodox Patriarchate in Constantinople to never lay claim to secular power, but submit to the Byzantine emperor and later the Ottoman sultan (supposedly the reason for the 'eastern submission to autocracy'), while the Catholic Papacy persistently laid claim to have authority over the secular princes of Western Europe (allegedly 'the roots of modern democracy'). E. Evans (1960) panned Sherrard's book, writing: '...it must be said that unless the obscurity of the writer's language has dulled the reader's intelligence, neither the Filioque clause nor the developments of modern international politics are really shown to depend on the western as opposed to the eastern, the Latin as opposed to the Greek, doctrine of God and of creation: the argument, if there is one, is per saltum, and need amount to no more than an a posteriori interpretation of historical facts in the light of preconceived ideas.'

According to English theologian Andrew Louth (2007), the Byzantine/Roman Empire and the early Church constituted a multilingual and 'multi-cultural civilization' until the 7th century, but after a period of transition, which he dated from 681 (Third Council of Constantinople) to 1071 (Battle of Manzikert), Christendom had split into a "Greek East" and "Latin West", which he considered 'two Christian civilizations' in reference to Huntington's Clash of Civilizations thesis. Louth primarily attributed this purported 'transition from multi-cultural Byzantium to Greek East and Latin West [to] the rise of Islam and the Arab destruction of the stability of the Mediterranean world in the seventh century.' Nevertheless, the transition was a slow and complicated process with many factors rather than a single historic event, which 'set the two halves of Christianity on their gradually diverging tracks', as Byzantine literature professor Alexander Alexakis (2010) summarised Louth's analysis. These included observations that the Byzantine church-state dualism remained intact after the Western Roman Empire's collapse, while bishops and eventually the pope in the West sometimes wielded secular power, but the Carolingian monarchs' renovatio also promoted theological thought at a time when the pope was embroiled in worldly affairs (8th–9th century), that the Byzantine Iconoclasm controversy caused 'the first rift between Rome and Constantinople', and that the simultaneous missionary efforts to convert the Slavs led to a 'second point of contention between Rome and Constantinople', especially in Bulgaria (9th–10th century). Louth agreed with 'the prevailing (and more plausible) theory that assigns no particular importance to the events of 1054' (the East–West Schism) 'as far as the people of that era were concerned', and that the schism only became significant during the preliminaries to the 1245 and 1274 Councils of Lyon.

The term "Greek" varies in how it is applied. In the most narrow sense, after the rise of the Roman Empire it is only applied to the Eastern Roman (Byzantine) Empire. Depending on the author it may also be applied to
 Areas where the Greek language was the common scholarly and religious language during classical Roman times and the early Middle Ages, including Syria, Egypt, Palestine, etc.
 Areas that have historically been in communion with the (formerly Byzantine) Eastern Orthodox Church, which includes Russia and much of Eastern Europe, but largely excludes Egypt, Syria, Armenia, etc. which largely opposed the influence of Constantinople having formed what are now called the Church of the East and Oriental Orthodoxy. The Romanians spoke a Romance language but followed the Byzantine Church.
 Areas that were heavily culturally influenced by the Byzantine Empire, directly or indirectly, during the Middle Ages, including Eastern Europe and the Islamic Empires
 note: among Muslim historians, "Greek" and "Roman" are often categories specifically associated with Christians. Though the Sultanate of Rome and, later, the Ottoman Empire would adopt Byzantine titles and describe themselves as rulers of "Rome," this was a geographic designation, much in the same way that the Ghaznavids or Delhi Sultans would be known as rulers of "Hindustan." 

The term "Latin" has survived much longer as a unifying term for the West because the Latin language survived until relatively recently as a scholarly and liturgical language despite the fragmentation and religious changes in Western Europe. The Greek language, by contrast, died out somewhat quickly in the Arab lands, and the Orthodox Slavic nations never fully embraced the language despite their long religious affiliation with the Eastern Romans/Byzantines.

See also
 Jireček Line

References

Bibliography 
 
 

Historical regions
Roman Empire
Cultural history of Greece
Classical antiquity
Christianity in late antiquity
East–West Schism
Christian terminology
Cultural geography
Mediterranean
Geography of the Middle East
Language geography
Western culture